Johann "Hans" Pirkner (born 25 March 1946, in Vienna) is a former Austrian football forward.

Club career
Pirkner played for several clubs, including Schalke 04 (1969–1971), Austria Wien (1974–1978) and First Vienna FC. When at Schalke, he was fined for two years due to his involvement in the 1971 Bundesliga scandal. The ban was however lifted by the ÖFB after a year. He ended his professional career after the 1978 World Cup Finals.

International career
He made his debut for Austria in September 1969 against West Germany and was a participant at the 1978 FIFA World Cup, where he was the oldest squad member. He earned 20 caps, scoring four goals.

Honours
Austrian Football Bundesliga (2):
 1975–76, 1977–78
Austrian Cup (1):
 1976–77
Austrian Bundesliga Top Goalscorer (1):
 1975–76

References

External links
 Hans Pirkner at Austria Wien archive 
 
 Hans Pirkner at Fussballportal 

1946 births
Living people
Footballers from Vienna
Austrian footballers
Austria international footballers
1978 FIFA World Cup players
FC Schalke 04 players
FK Austria Wien players
First Vienna FC players
Austrian Football Bundesliga players
Bundesliga players
Expatriate footballers in West Germany
Association football forwards
FC Admira Wacker Mödling players
FC Kärnten
Austrian expatriate footballers
Austrian expatriate sportspeople in West Germany